David Perlmutter is a Naples, Florida–based American celebrity doctor and author.

Career
Perlmutter is the author of health books, and is known for advocating a functional and holistic approach toward treating brain disorders. Perlmutter serves as a medical advisor for The Dr. Oz Show and Men's Health.

Perlmutter wrote the book Grain Brain, released in September 2013, promoting the concept that gluten causes neurological conditions, which became a bestseller.

Although not primarily a medical researcher, he has published in the medical literature. He was the president of the Perlmutter Health Center until its sale in 2015.

Awards
Perlmutter has received the 2002 Linus Pauling Award (of the Institute for Functional Medicine), and 2006 National Nutritional Foods Association Clinician Award. In 2015, Perlmutter was awarded the "Communications and Media Award" from the American College of Nutrition In 2019, Perlmutter was awarded the Leadership Award from the Integrative Healthcare Symposium.

Criticism
Perlmutter and his books have faced criticism from other physicians and commentators. For example, Nash and Slutzky (2014) have written that "according to Grain Brain, much chronic disease originates in the widespread ingestion of carbohydrates, and these foodstuff, rather than cholesterol or saturated fats, are the premier contributor to an unhealthy individual. Numerous recent studies, however, have provided high-level evidence to the contrary."

Epidemiologist David Katz, founding director of the Yale-Griffin Prevention Research Center at Griffin Hospital in Derby, CT, has criticized Grain Brain, calling it a "silly book" and saying that "Perlmutter is way ahead of any justifiable conclusion".

Microbiome expert Jonathan Eisen criticized Brain Maker in blunt terms. "To think we can magically heal diseases by changing to a gluten-free diet and taking some probiotics is idiotic... It resembles more the presentation of a snake-oil salesman than that of a person interested in actually figuring out how to help people."

Perlmutter's advice to parents that they should ask their pediatricians about scheduling childhood vaccinations separately is contrary to advice from the CDC and the American Academy of Pediatrics.

David Perlmutter is listed by Quackwatch as a promoter of questionable health products.

Books

References

External links 
 
 
 http://www.autismspeaks.org/resource/perlmutter-health-center
 http://www.hayhouse.com/authorbio.php?id=621
 http://www.abihm.org/doctor-details
 http://pilladvised.com/2012/03/dr-perlmutter-lecture-at-nyu-medical-school/
 http://www.functionalmedicine.org/about/ourteam/faculty/
 http://www.huffingtonpost.com/dr-david-perlmutter-md/
 http://www.thedailybeast.com/contributors/david-perlmutter--md.html
 http://www.mindbodygreen.com/wc/dr-david-perlmutter
 http://www.nytimes.com/best-sellers-books/2013-10-06/hardcover-nonfiction/list.html
 http://www.nytimes.com/best-sellers-books/2013-10-20/dining/list.html
 http://www.doctoroz.com/medadvisoryboard/david-perlmutter
 http://thejns.org/doi/abs/10.3171/jns.1976.45.3.0259?prevSearch=%2528David%2BPerlmutter%2529%2Band%2B%255BFulltext%253A%2BDavid%2BPerlmutter%255D&searchHistoryKey=
 http://journals.lww.com/smajournalonline/Citation/1985/11000/_Hidden__Disks_and_Computerized_Tomography.20.aspx
 http://archneur.jamanetwork.com/article.aspx?articleid=585908&resultClick=3
 https://www.functionalmedicine.org/about/history-founders/Linus_Pauling/
 http://www.npainfo.org/NPA/AboutNPA/AnnualAwardsPastWinners.aspx
 http://208.106.230.67/Default.aspx?tabid=142
 http://www.hindawi.com/crim/immunology/2013/248482/abs/
 http://www.imjournal.com/index.cfm/fuseaction/archives.main&mode=issue&issueid=7284
 http://www.liebertpub.com/editorialboard/brain-and-gut/628/
 https://stayingalive.com/experts/david-perlmutter/

1954 births
American neurologists
American health and wellness writers
Living people
People from Naples, Florida
Writers from Florida
Lafayette College alumni
Leonard M. Miller School of Medicine alumni
Pseudoscientific diet advocates
Celebrity doctors